Lisovo is a rural locality in Polevskoy Selsoviet Rural Settlement, Kursky District, Kursk Oblast, Russia. Population:

Geography 
The village is located on the Seym River (a left tributary of the Desna), 104 km from the Russia–Ukraine border, 29 km south-east of the district center – the town Kursk, 6 km from the selsoviet center – Polevaya.

 Climate
Lisovo has a warm-summer humid continental climate (Dfb in the Köppen climate classification).

Transport 
Lisovo is located 8 km from the federal route  (Kursk – Voronezh –  "Kaspy" Highway; a part of the European route ), 6.5 km from the road of regional importance  (R-298 – Polevaya), on the road of intermunicipal significance  (38K-014 – Demino), 2.5 km from the nearest railway halt Gutorovo (railway line Klyukva — Belgorod).

The rural locality is situated 28 km from Kursk Vostochny Airport, 106 km from Belgorod International Airport and 183 km from Voronezh Peter the Great Airport.

References

Notes

Sources

Rural localities in Kursky District, Kursk Oblast